Lacinipolia consimilis is a species of cutworm or dart moth in the family Noctuidae. It is found in North America.

The MONA or Hodges number for Lacinipolia consimilis is 10420.

References

Further reading

 
 
 
 

Eriopygini
Articles created by Qbugbot
Moths described in 1937